Homocysteine methylase may refer to:

 Homocysteine S-methyltransferase
 5-methyltetrahydropteroyltriglutamate—homocysteine S-methyltransferase